Patrick Onnockx (born 15 July 1959) is a Belgian former professional racing cyclist. He rode in two editions of the Tour de France.

References

External links

1959 births
Living people
Belgian male cyclists
Cyclists from Flemish Brabant
People from Halle, Belgium